Ministry or department (also less commonly used secretariat, office, or directorate) are designations used by first-level executive bodies in the machinery of governments that manage a specific sector of public administration. 

These types of organizations are usually led by a politician who is a member of a cabinet—a body of high-ranking government officials—who may use a title such as minister, secretary, or commissioner, and are typically staffed with members of a non-political civil service, who manage its operations; they may also oversee other government agencies and organizations as part of a political portfolio. Governments may have differing numbers and types of ministries and departments. In some countries, these terms may be used with specific meanings: for example, an office may be a subdivision of a department or ministry.

Usage

Canada

The federal Government of Canada uses the term department to refer to its first-level executive bodies.

Subdivisions 
In Canada, first-level subdivisions are known as provinces and territories. Five of the ten provincial governments use the term ministry to describe their departments (Ontario, Quebec, Saskatchewan, British Columbia, and Alberta) but the other five, as well as the three territorial governments, use the term department. Despite the difference in nomenclature, both the provincial and federal governments use the term "minister" to describe the head of a ministry or department. The specific task assigned to a minister is referred to as his or her "portfolio".

United Kingdom

In the United Kingdom, all government organisations that consist of civil servants, and which may or may not be headed by a government minister or secretary of state, are considered to be departments. Until 2018, the term "ministry" had been retained only for the Ministry of Defence and the Ministry of Justice. On 8 January 2018, Prime Minister Theresa May announced that the Department of Communities and Local Government would be renamed at the Ministry of Housing, Communities and Local Government to emphasise her government's prioritising of housing policy.

Other countries
Some countries, such as Switzerland, the Philippines and the United States, do not use or no longer use the term "ministry" and instead call their main government bodies "departments". However, in other countries such as Luxembourg a department is a subdivision of a ministry, usually led by a government member called a secretary of state who is subordinate to the minister. 

In Australia at the federal level, and also at the state level, the term Ministry refers to the ministerial office held by a member of Cabinet, the executive, which is then responsible for one or more departments, the top division of the public service. The collection of departments responsible to a ministerial office and hence the minister, is referred to as the minister's "portfolio".

New Zealand's state agencies include many ministries and a smaller number of departments. Increasingly, state agencies are styled neither as ministries nor as departments. All New Zealand agencies are under the direction of one or more ministers or associate ministers, whether they are styled ministries or not. Each body also has an apolitical chief executive, and in ministries and departments these chief executives often have the title of Secretary.

In Indonesia, the term ministry is used. From the New Order to 2009, the office was known as department.

In Hong Kong, the term bureau is used, and departments are subordinate to the bureaus. 

In Mexico, ministries are referred to as secretariats. 

In 1999, the ministries of the federal government of Belgium became known as federal public service, the exception being the Ministry of Defense which kept the original designation.

In the Republic of China, ministry is used.

In the People's Republic of China, ministry is used.

In Portugal, the organization adopted by the XXI (2015-2019) and the XXII (since 2019) governments ceased to expressly foresee the existence of ministries, with the portfolios of the ministers being referred as "governative areas". While some governative areas inherited the previously established ministerial organizations and continued to structured as traditional ministries (Finance, National Defense, Foreign Affairs, etc.), the other governative areas received a more flexible organization.

In Nigeria each ministry is led by a minister who is not a member of the Nigerian legislature (due to the separation of powers) and is responsible to the popularly elected president.

In Lebanon, there are 21 ministries. Each ministry is led by a minister, and the Prime Minister is the 23rd minister of the Lebanese government.

In the European Union, the equivalent organisation to a national government department is termed directorate-general with the civil servant in charge called a director-general (in the European Commission, the political head of the department is one of the European Commissioners). 

The government departments of the Soviet Union were termed people's commissariats between 1917 and 1946. Ministry was used, thereafter.

In popular culture
The term ministry has also been widely used in fiction, notably in satires and parodies.

Books and films
Portrayals of various fictional government ministries include:
 The Ministry of Magic is the governing body of the wizarding world of the United Kingdom and Ireland in the Harry Potter series (not a department of the British Government responsible for magical affairs). It is led by a Minister for Magic.
 In the novel Nineteen Eighty-Four there are four Ministries in charge of Oceania: the Ministry of Truth (education, culture and propaganda), the Ministry of Love (the interior, security and policing), the Ministry of Plenty (economic affairs) and the Ministry of Peace (war and foreign affairs).
 The Ministry of Information Retrieval features in the film Brazil.
 The Ministry of Social Coherence appears in an Estonian comedy series Riigimehed (Statesmen).

Television
 In Yes Minister the Department of Administrative Affairs (DAA) is responsible for the administration of other government departments and the British Civil Service. This ministry had a number of other responsibilities, including National Health Service administration, local government, organising state visits by foreign leaders, enforcing European regulations, the arts and telecommunications.
The Thick of It is set at the fictional Department of Social Affairs, later called the Department of Social Affairs and Citizenship, or "DoSAC" for short.
 The Ministry of Silly Walks is the subject of a sketch in Monty Python's Flying Circus.
 The Spanish television show El ministerio del tiempo follows the exploits of an investigative team in the fictional Ministry of Time, which deals with incidents caused by time travel that can cause changes to the present day

See also

 Cabinet (government)
 Ministry (collective executive)
 Individual ministerial responsibility
 Housing authority
 Ministry of Social Security

References

External links 
 

Public administration